Pellezzano is a town and comune in the province of Salerno in the Campania region of south-western Italy.

Geography
Pellezzano borders with the municipalities of Baronissi, Cava de' Tirreni and Salerno.

It counts 6 civil parishes (frazioni): Capezzano, Capriglia, Cologna, Coperchia, Grotte and Rione Piombino.

References

External links

Cities and towns in Campania